Hourglass is the debut studio album by American DJs Mako. It was released on 9 December 2016 via Ultra Records. A remix album would be released on April 28, 2017, via Ultra Records.

Background 
Several songs from the album were recorded few years ago including "I Wish You Back", "Let Go Of The Wheel" and "Our Story" which was re-created to be added to the album. Seaver said 2015 was the year it became apparent that they were making an album.

Title 
The album title was named because Seaver felt that an hourglass represents time in a creative way. The time he spent in working on the album was also a reason of the name.

Singles 
"Smoke Filled Room" was released as the first single on 14 August 2015. Its accompanying music video was released

"Way Back Home" was released as the second single on 18 December 2015.

"Into the Sunset" was released as the third single on 22 April 2016.

"Wish You Back" featuring American singer Kwesi was released as the fifth single on 9 December 2016, together with the album.

Promotional singles 

The Him's remix of "Wish You Back" was released as the first promotional single on 3 November 2016.

"Let Go of the Wheel" was released as the second promotional single on 19 November 2016. Alex Seaver of Mako commented on Facebook that it took them a whole year to finish the track, as well as it also being one of his favorite songs they have ever made.

Track listing

Hourglass

Hourglass (The Remixes)

Charts

References 

2016 debut albums
Mako (DJ) albums